Kholagaun  is a village development committee in Western Rukum District in Karnali Province of western Nepal. At the time of the 1991 Nepal census it had a population of 4,462 living in 778 individual households.

References

Populated places in Western Rukum District